Hale's Filling Station and Grocery is a site on the National Register of Historic Places located in Roosevelt County, Montana.  It was added to the Register on August 16, 1994.  It was a service station and a grocery store built probably in the late 1920s.

It is located on what was in 1994, an abandoned segment of old U.S. 2, between Bainville and Culbertson, Montana in the far northeastern corner of the state.  It was the only remaining original building of the former town of Lanark.

When listed in 1994, the building was vacant and not in use.

References
 

Gas stations on the National Register of Historic Places in Montana
National Register of Historic Places in Roosevelt County, Montana
Buildings and structures completed in 1928
Grocery store buildings
Unused buildings in Montana
1928 establishments in Montana